Chambersville is an unincorporated community in Indiana County, Pennsylvania, United States. Chambersville has a post office with ZIP code 15723.

References

Unincorporated communities in Indiana County, Pennsylvania
Unincorporated communities in Pennsylvania